Amores Roubados (English title: Doomed) is a Brazilian miniseries produced by Rede Globo and displayed between 6–17 January 2014, totaling 10 episodes. Starring Cauã Reymond, Isis Valverde, Dira Paes, Patricia Pillar and Murilo Benicio in the lead roles.

Plot 
Passion knows no limits. Doomed tells the story of Leandro (Cauã Reymond), a sophisticated sommelier and a real Don Juan. After returning to his native city, he has a romance with Celeste (Dira Paes), who is married to a powerful businessman. Due to his insatiable appetite for women, he also becomes involved with Isabel (Patrícia Pillar), the wife of his boss, Jaime (Murilo Benício). For Leandro, seducing women is just a game until he is taken by surprise upon falling in love with Antônia (Isis Valverde), the couple’s daughter. This young girl makes him question his convictions and together, they are thrown into a thrilling story of desire, jealousy and revenge.

Antônia’s mother is discreet and totally devoted to her family. Torn between her daughter’s and her husband’s desires, she tries, unsuccessfully, to ease the bitter feelings between the two. Celeste, on the other hand, is a passionate and seductive woman who hides her affair with the sommelier from everyone.

When Leandro’s boss discovers his wife’s infidelity, his angry outburst coincides with the disappearance of his sommelier. Was it a planned escape or a crime of passion? The uncertainty only elevates the suspense in this explosive mixture of action, romance, mystery and sensuality.

Cast

Production 
The miniseries was recorded in Petrolina and Lagoa Grande in Pernambuco and Juazeiro and Paulo Afonso in Bahia. Some scenes were shot in other cities in Northeast Brazil. It was written by George Moura, Sergio Goldenberg, Flávio Araújo and Teresa Fleet, with text supervision of Maria Adelaide Amaral, and directed by José Luiz Villamarim and Ricardo Waddington.

The miniseries is an adaptation of the book A Emparedada da Rua Nova written by journalist and founder of Academia Pernambucana de Letras, Ram Vilela (1846–1913).

References

External links 
 

2014 in Brazilian television
Brazilian television miniseries
2014 Brazilian television series debuts
2014 Brazilian television series endings
Portuguese-language television shows